Baseball at the 1992 Summer Olympics marked the debut of baseball as an official medal sport at the Olympics. The games were contested in Barcelona as part of the 1992 Summer Olympics. Baseball was an event open only to amateurs, although Cuba used its best players as they were amateurs in name only with all necessary funding coming from the state. The maximum roster size was 20 players per team.

Eight nations competed, with the preliminary phase consisting of each team playing every other team.  Playoffs were then held, with the four highest ranked teams advancing. For the semifinals, the first place team played the fourth place team, and the second place team played against the third place team. The winners of those semifinals competed against each other for the gold medal, with the loser getting the silver medal. The teams defeated in the semifinals played a match for the bronze medal. Cuba won gold, with Chinese Taipei (Taiwan) winning silver, and Japan winning bronze.

Medalists

Teams
  (Hosts)
  (1987 Asian Baseball Championship silver medalist)
  (1987 Asian Baseball Championship gold medalist)
  (1991 European Baseball Championship gold medalist)
  (1991 Pan American games gold medalist)
  (1991 Pan American games silver medalist)
  (1991 Pan American games bronze medalist)
  (1991 Pan American games fourth place)

Preliminary round

Round 1

Round 2

Round 3

Round 4

Round 5

Round 6

Round 7

Knockout round

Semifinals

Bronze medal match

Final

Final standing

Schedule
Baseball events took place over 11 days, from July 26 to August 5.

 July 26
 ITA - TPE (10:30, L'Hospitalet)
 DOM - CUB (10:30, Viladecans)
 USA - ESP (18:00, L'Hospitalet)
 JPN - PUR (18:00, Viladecans)
 July 27
 USA - TPE (15:00, L'Hospitalet)
 CUB - ITA (15:00, Viladecans)
 DOM - PUR (21:00, L'Hospitalet)
 ESP - JPN (21:00, Viladecans)
 July 28
 PUR - TPE (15:00, L'Hospitalet)
 ITA - USA (15:00, Viladecans)
 CUB - JPN (21:00, L'Hospitalet)
 ESP - DOM (21:00, Viladecans)
 July 29
 JPN - DOM (15:00, L'Hospitalet)
 ITA - PUR (15:00, Viladecans)
 USA - CUB (21:00, L'Hospitalet)
 ESP - TPE (21:00, Viladecans)
 July 31
 ITA - JPN (15:00, L'Hospitalet)
 TPE - DOM (15:00, Viladecans)
 CUB - ESP (21:00, L'Hospitalet)
 PUR - USA (21:00, Viladecans)
 August 1
 PUR - CUB (15:00, L'Hospitalet)
 TPE - JPN (15:00, Viladecans)
 ESP - ITA (21:00, L'Hospitalet)
 DOM - USA (21:00, Viladecans)
 August 2
 DOM - ITA (15:00, L'Hospitalet)
 PUR - ESP (15:00, Viladecans)
 JPN - USA (21:00, L'Hospitalet)
 TPE - CUB (21:00, Viladecans)
 August 4
 TPE - JPN (15:00, L'Hospitalet)
 USA - CUB (21:00, L'Hospitalet)
 August 5
 JPN - USA (15:00, L'Hospitalet)
 CUB - TPE (21:00, L'Hospitalet)

References

External links
 Barcelona 1992 – Baseball Men Results at Olympics.com

 
1992 Summer Olympics events
1992
Olympics
1992